Gyeran-ppang ("egg bread") is a warm street snack sold throughout South Korea. The fluffy, oblong-shaped loaf of bread is sweet and savory with a whole egg inside the pancake dough.

Preparation 
A Gyeran-ppang machine is an appliance with a few dozen oblong slots for pouring cake batter and eggs. The cake mix usually consists of wheat flour, baking powder, milk, eggs, butter, sugar, salt and vanilla extract. A whole egg is cracked onto the batter in each slot, and the egg breads are cooked till golden brown. Common toppings include chopped parsley, cheese, and diced ham.

History 
Egg bread was first made at the back gate of Inha University in 1984.

Gallery

See also 

 List of egg dishes
 List of Korean dishes

References 

Bread dishes
Egg dishes
Street food in South Korea